Íñigo Fernández de Velasco (1462–17 September 1528), 2nd Duke of Frías, Grandee of Spain, and Constable of Castile, was a Spanish nobleman.

Fernández de Velasco was the son of Pedro Fernández de Velasco and of Mencía de Mendoza y Figueroa. He inherited the titles from his older brother Bernardino, who had no legitimate male issue. He married María de Tovar, Lady of Berlanga, with whom he had six children.

Pedro Fernández de Velasco, 3rd Duke of Frías
Juan Sancho de Tovar, 1st Marquis of Berlanga
Mencía de Velasco
María de Velasco, nun
Isabel de Velasco
Juana de Velasco; married to Francisco Tomás de Borja y Centelles 
Íñigo de Borja; married to Hélène de Bossu.

He took part in the Revolt of the Comuneros, leading the royalist army to crushing victory at the Battle of Villalar.

Sources

1462 births
1528 deaths
102
104
Inigo
Inigo 02
Knights of the Golden Fleece
15th-century Castilians
Grandees of Spain
People of the Revolt of the Comuneros